Look Closer may refer to:

 "Crabbit Old Woman", a poem by Phyllis McCormack that is also titled "Look Closer"
 "Look Closer", an episode of the television series Judging Amy

See also
 A Closer Look (disambiguation)